A garbhagriha or sannidhanam is the sanctum sanctorum, the innermost sanctuary of a Hindu and Jain temples where resides the murti (idol or icon) of the primary deity of the temple. In Jainism, the main deity is known as the Mulnayaka. Literally the word means "womb chamber", from the Sanskrit words garbha for womb and griha for house. Although the term is often associated with Hindu temples, it is also found in Jain and Buddhist temples.  Traditionally, in Hinduism only 'priests' (pujari) are allowed to enter this chamber, though in modern practice this is often considerably relaxed.

Architecture

The room has a single entrance, normally facing east to be accessed by the rising sun, and no windows.  It is normally square, and at least approximately a cube, with the representation of the temple's deity placed in the centre, so that it can be seen by worshippers outside.  Relative to the size of the temple, and especially the large tower arising over it, it is a rather small room, and there is no view from below up into the shikhara or tower, which is treated as completely solid, although in fact for structural reasons it very often includes a hollow space. 
   
In the great majority of temples with a tower superstructure, a shikhara (in the north) or vimana (in the south), this chamber is placed directly underneath it, and the two of them form the main vertical axis of the temple. These together may be understood to represent the axis of the world through Mount Meru. The garbhagriha is usually also on the main horizontal axis of the temple which generally is an east–west axis.

Generally the garbhagriha is a windowless and sparsely lit chamber, intentionally created thus to focus the devotee's mind on the tangible form of the divine within it. Entrance to the Hindu garbhagriha is very often restricted to priests who perform the services there, and in temples in active worship (as opposed to historic monuments) normally to Hindus at the least. In Jain temples all suitably bathed and purified Jains are allowed inside.

Hinduism

In the Dravida style, the garbhagriha took the form of a miniature vimana with other features exclusive to southern Indian temple architecture such as the inner wall together with the outer wall creating a pradakshina around the garbhagriha. The entrance is highly decorated. The inner garbhagriha or shrine became a separate structure, more elaborately adorned over time.

The garbhagriha is normally square and sits on a plinth, its location calculated to be a point of total equilibrium and harmony as it is representative of a microcosm of the Universe. In the centre is placed the image of the deity.

In some early temples it is not quite square, and in some later ones may be rectangular where more than one deity is worshipped and has an image there.  There are a very few examples of larger variance; the chamber at Gudimallam is both semi-circular at the rear, and set below the main floor level of the temple.  The famous 7th-century Durga temple, Aihole has a rounded apse at the garbagriha end, which is echoed in the shape of the chamber.

Girbhagriha in Tamil: In Tamil language Girbha griha is called karuvarai meaning the interior of the sanctumnsanctorum. It is the iner- most of the sanctum and focus of the temple, where the image of the primary deity resides. The word karuarai means "womb chamber". The word' karu' means foetus and arai means a room.

But sometimes, for the temples of feminine deities, the garbagriha is rectangular. For example, in the temple of Varahi Deula in Chaurasi.

The present structure of most of these temples is a two-storeyed vimana with a square garbhagriha and a surrounding circumambulatory path, an ardha-mandapa and a narrower maha-mandapa.

Notes

References
Hardy, Adam, Indian Temple Architecture: Form and Transformation : the Karṇāṭa Drāviḍa Tradition, 7th to 13th Centuries, 1995, Abhinav Publications, 9788170173120, google books.
 George Michell, Monuments of India (Penguin Guides, Vol. 1, 1989).

External links

 Temple architecture
 Parts of a North Indian Temple

Hindu temple architecture
Architecture in India